Sicelo Shiceka (8 June 1966 – 30 April 2012) was a South African politician.

A member of the African National Congress, Shiceka was a member of the National Assembly and was chosen by President Jacob Zuma as the Minister of Cooperative Governance and Traditional Affairs in May 2009. From 2008 to 2009, Shiceka was the Minister of Provincial and Local Government under interim President Kgalema Motlanthe.

Shiceka was, until his death, on sick leave (since 24 February 2011), and his duties as Minister of Co-operative Governance and Traditional Affairs were being performed by the Minister of Police, Nathi Mthethwa, in an acting capacity. Shiceka died from complications relating to a long illness.

Biography
Previous posts Shiceka held included Leader of the Azanian Students Organisation (1987), Provincial Secretary of the SACP (1991), Provincial Secretary of COSATU (1992) and Member of the Gauteng Provincial Executive Council of the ANC (1996).  He was also a director of the 2010 FIFA World Cup Local Organising Committee.

Shiceka earned an M.A. in political economy from the University of the Free State, and diplomas in labour relations from the University of the Witwatersrand and in economics from the Wharton School of the University of Pennsylvania in the United States.

Shiceka died on 30 April 2012, after "a long illness". No cause of death was given.  He was 45.

Controversy
In March 2011, accusations were leveled at Shiceka for allegedly abusing taxpayer money by using public funds to pay for luxury hotel stays, limousine services and first-class air travel tickets while flying for personal reasons.  These allegations in turn led to widespread calls from opposition parties for his dismissal, to which Parliament's Ethics Committee responded by calling on the Public Protector to investigate the allegations – the first time MPs from the ANC called officially for a Cabinet Minister to be investigated for corruption since the party came to power in 1994.  Following the publication of the report by the Public Protector confirming Shiceka had violated the Constitution and Executive Ethics Act, he was fired from the cabinet by President Jacob Zuma. The Department of Co-operative Governance is now attempting to recover over R800 000 he spent illegally. Additional allegations surfaced regarding an improper relationship between Shiceka and the chief financial officer of the bankrupt Madibeng Local Municipality, Nana Masithela.

References

1966 births
2012 deaths
African National Congress politicians
Members of the National Assembly of South Africa
Government ministers of South Africa
Wharton School of the University of Pennsylvania alumni
University of the Witwatersrand alumni
University of the Free State alumni